The 2023 UEFA Europa Conference League Final will be the final match of the 2022–23 UEFA Europa Conference League, the second season of Europe's tertiary club football tournament organised by UEFA. It is scheduled to be played on 7 June 2023 at Fortuna Arena in Prague, Czech Republic.

The winners will qualify to enter the group stage of the 2023–24 UEFA Europa League, unless they have already qualified for the Champions League or Europa League through their league performance (in which case the access list will be rebalanced).

Venue
The Fortuna Arena previously hosted the 2013 UEFA Super Cup, as well as four matches at the 2015 UEFA European Under-21 Championship, including the final.

Host selection
A bidding process was launched by UEFA to select the venues of the finals of the UEFA Europa Conference League for both 2022 and 2023. Associations interested in hosting one of the finals had until 20 February 2020 to submit bid dossiers.

The decision was originally scheduled to be made by the UEFA Executive Committee during their meeting on 3 December 2020. However, UEFA later decided to reopen the bidding process after appointing the host for the 2022 final only. Member associations had until 30 September 2021 to confirm their intention to submit a bid, while the bids must be submitted by 23 February 2022. Six associations expressed interest in hosting the final.

The UEFA Executive Committee appointed the Fortuna Arena as the host during their meeting in Vienna, Austria, on 10 May 2022.

Pre-match

Identity 
The original identity of the 2023 UEFA Europa Conference League Final was unveiled at the group stage draw on 26 August 2022.

Ambassador 
The ambassador for the final is former Czech international Vladimír Šmicer, who won 2000–01 UEFA Cup and 2004–05 UEFA Champions League with Liverpool.

Match

Details
The "home" team (for administrative purposes) was determined by an additional draw held after the quarter-final and semi-final draws.

See also
2023 UEFA Champions League Final
2023 UEFA Europa League Final
2023 UEFA Women's Champions League Final
2023 UEFA Super Cup

Notes

References

External links

2023
Final
Scheduled association football competitions
June 2023 sports events in Europe
International club association football competitions hosted by the Czech Republic
2022–23 in Czech football
Sports competitions in Prague
2020s in Prague